Comin' Atcha is the fourth studio album by Madeline Bell, released by RCA Records on 22 December 1973. The album was produced, arranged and recorded with John Paul Jones at his home studio, Dormouse Studios. It was Madeline Bell's first solo album in two years after performing for musical theatre, television shows, studio backing sessions, film themes and pop group Blue Mink (1969–73). The project was also a major departure in musical direction for John Paul Jones, playing a mixture of funk, jazz, r&b and soul for the recording, during the year-long absence from touring Led Zeppelin undertook in late 1973 and throughout 1974. John Paul Jones had previously sessioned for Madeline Bell in 1968, before joining Led Zeppelin.

Both Bell and Jones performed the album's title track on BBC2's television programme Colour My Soul, on 6 December 1973.

Track listing
All tracks composed by John Paul Jones and Madeline Bell
"Make a Move" - 5:01
"Without You (I Know What I'll Do)" - 5:46
"I'm So Glad" - 3:48
"Gram" - 4:16
"Another Girl" - 4:59
"Comin' Atcha" - 3:19
"Little Ones" - 3:08
"I Wanna Be Around (You!!)" - 3:36
"Things" - 4:33
"That's What It's All About" - 3:11

Personnel
Madeline Bell - vocals
John Paul Jones - keyboards, synthesiser, bass guitar, guitars, backing vocals, producer, engineer
Jean-Pierre "Rolling" Azoulay - guitar
Barry De Souza, Tony Newman - drums
Jim Lawless - percussion
Barry St. John, Doris Troy, Jacques Ploquin, Liza Strike, Mo Jones - backing vocals
David Katz - conductor

Additional notes

Catalogue: RCA Records SF 8393

External links 
 John Paul Jones TV Performance w/ Madeline Bell

1973 albums
Madeline Bell albums
Albums arranged by John Paul Jones (musician)
RCA Records albums
albums recorded at Morgan Sound Studios